was a fleet oiler for the Imperial Japanese Navy.  A member of the Notoro-class of oilers, the ship was launched on August 5, 1922 and served Japan during the Pacific Campaign of World War II.  On March 31, 1944 the ship was attacked and sunk in Palau Harbor by United States Navy aircraft carrier aircraft from the Fast Carrier Task Force during Operation Desecrate One.

In March 2015 a PRC flag was discovered tied to the wreckage. The flag was subsequently removed and president of Palau Tommy Remengesau stated that he was "extremely disappointed".

References

External links
 
 

1922 ships
Notoro-class oilers
Ships sunk by US aircraft
World War II shipwrecks in the Pacific Ocean
Ships built by Osaka Iron Works